A car chase or vehicle pursuit is the vehicular overland chase of one party by another, involving at least one automobile or other wheeled motor vehicle in pursuit, commonly hot pursuit of suspects by law enforcement. The rise of the automotive industry in the 20th century increased car ownership, leading to a growing number of criminals attempting to evade police in their own vehicle or a stolen car. Car chases may, instead (or also) involve other parties (including criminals) in pursuit of a criminal suspect or intended victim, or simply in an attempt to make contact with a moving person for non-conflict reasons.

Car chases are often captured on news broadcast due to the video footage recorded by police cars, police aircraft, and news aircraft participating in the chase. Car chases are also a popular subject with media and audiences due to their intensity, drama and the innate danger of high-speed driving, and thus are common content in fiction, particularly action films and video games.

Police

History 
Car chases occur when a suspect attempts to use a vehicle to escape from law enforcement attempting to detain or arrest them. The assumed offence committed may range from misdemeanours such as traffic infractions to felonies as serious as murder. When suspects realize they have been spotted by law enforcement, they attempt to lose their pursuer by driving away, usually at high speed. Generally, suspects who police spot committing crimes for which long prison terms are likely upon conviction are much more likely to start car chases. In 2002, 700 pursuits were reported in the city of Los Angeles.

Los Angeles television station KCAL reported a quadrupling of ratings when police pursuits aired. Police officials have asked news media to reduce coverage of chases, claiming that they encourage suspects to flee and inciting gawkers to possibly get in the way of the pursuit, while the media responds that coverage of chases provides a public service and provide a deterrent to police brutality.

Police use a number of techniques to end chases, from pleading with the driver, waiting for the driver's vehicle to run out of fuel, or hoping the driver's vehicle becomes somehow disabled to more forceful methods such as boxing in the vehicle with police cruisers, ramming the vehicle, the PIT maneuver, shooting out the tires, or the use of spike strips, though all efforts, many of which pose risk to all involved as well as bystanders, will be aimed at avoiding danger to civilians. When available, a helicopter may be employed, which in some cases, may follow the vehicle from above while ground units may or may not be involved. The StarChase system as of summer 2009 was in use by the Arizona Department of Public Safety.

The first police chase known to be recorded on video was in 1988 in Berea, Ohio.  

The February 2005 Macquarie Fields riots occurred in Sydney, Australia after a local driver crashed a stolen vehicle into a tree, killing his two passengers following a high-speed police pursuit. The death of university student Clea Rose following a police chase in Canberra sparked major recriminations over police pursuit policies. Ole Christian Bach was found shot and killed in Sweden in a presumed suicide after he had been followed in a car chase by Swedish undercover police.

Reality television has combined with the car chase genre in a number of television shows and specials featuring real footage, mostly taken from police cruisers and law enforcement or media helicopters of suspects fleeing police.

One notable, recorded police chase occurred when an M60 Patton tank was stolen by Shawn Nelson from an Army National Guard armory, on May 17, 1995. Nelson went on a rampage through San Diego, California, with the massive tank crushing multiple civilian vehicles before becoming stuck on a road divider. Police were able to mount the tank and open the hatch, killing the suspect when he would not surrender.

On June 4, 2004, welder Marvin Heemeyer went on a rampage in a heavily modified bulldozer in Granby, Colorado, wrecking 13 buildings including the town hall, the public library, a bank, a concrete batch plant, and a house owned by the town's former mayor, resulting in over $7 million in damage. The police were initially powerless, as none of their weapons could penetrate the suspect's vehicle. However, the bulldozer's engine failed and the machine became stuck, so Heemeyer committed suicide by gunshot.

On July 27, 2007 in Phoenix, Arizona, two helicopters collided in mid air while filming a police pursuit. Both were AS-350 AStar news helicopters from the KNXV-TV and KTVK news stations. All four occupants of both aircraft were killed. No one on the ground was injured.

On September 28, 2012, Fox News aired a live police chase in Arizona which ended in the suspect exiting the vehicle and shooting himself after a short foot chase. Fox News was airing it in a five-second delay instead of a normal ten-second delay, which resulted in the shooting being aired on a live broadcast of the Fox Report. Fox anchorman Shepard Smith soon apologized for the broadcast and vowed to never let it happen again.

Risks and legal considerations
High-speed car chases are recognized as a road safety problem, as vehicles not involved in the pursuit or pedestrians or street furniture may be hit by the elusive driver, who will often violate a number of traffic laws, often repeatedly, in their attempt to escape, or by the pursuing police cars. In the United Kingdom, it is estimated that 40 people a year are killed in road traffic incidents involving police, most as a result of a police pursuit. In the United States, chase-related deaths range between 300 and 400 people per year.

Kristie's Law was a proposed California law that would restrict immunity for damage (including injuries or deaths) caused by high-speed pursuits, where law enforcement agencies have established, but not followed, written pursuit policies.

In 2007, the United States Supreme Court held in Scott v. Harris (550 U.S. 372) that a "police officer's attempt to terminate a dangerous high-speed car chase that threatens the lives of innocent bystanders does not violate the Fourth Amendment, even when it places the fleeing motorist at risk of serious injury or death."

In most common law jurisdictions, the fireman's rule prevents police officers injured in such pursuits from filing civil lawsuits for monetary damages against the fleeing suspects, because such injuries are supposed to be an inherent risk of the job.  Public outrage at such immunity has resulted in statutory exceptions. One example is California Civil Code Section 1714.9 (enacted 1982), which reinstates liability where the suspect knew or should have known that the police were present.

Policy on what circumstances justify a high-speed pursuit differ by jurisdiction. Some safety advocates want to restrict risky chases to violent felonies. Another option is to use technology to end or avoid the need for such chases.  For example, vehicles can be tracked by aircraft or GPS tagging device like StarChase, allowing police agencies to reliably intercept suspects using stationary blockades, lower-speed vehicles, or when the vehicle is parked.

Inter-jurisdictional pursuits and policy issues
One particular hazard that is attendant to police pursuits is the problem of multiple law enforcement agencies becoming involved in a car chase that crosses municipal and jurisdictional boundaries. This is often complicated by radio communication incompatibility and policy differences in the various departments involved in a pursuit.

The city of Dallas, Texas was the first major city in the United States to adopt an "Inter-Jurisdictional Pursuit Policy" to address the problems inherent in car chases that involved more than one law enforcement agency. In August 1984, the Dallas Police Department's Planning and Research Division, under the command of Captain Rick Stone, began crafting a policy that more than twenty (20) local law enforcement agencies could agree to abide by when car chases crossed their borders. The result was a model policy that became the standard for use by police departments around the United States.

In Europe, as many national borders no longer have border stations, car chases may sometimes cross national boundaries. States often have agreements in place where the police of one state can continue the chase across the national boundary.

Non-police car chases 

Some car chases may occur between vehicles that are not involved in law enforcement. These may be conducted by rival criminals, criminals attempting to catch intended victims, vigilantes, or as part of road rage. They may also occur for non-criminal reasons, such as the pursuing vehicle simply attempting to catch up to another vehicle. These car chases are rare and are almost always considered illegal due to the dangers of civilian vehicles, lacking any sort of warning device or authorization, pursuing each other at high speeds.

In 2021, Terrence J was pursued and shot at by a vehicle in an attempted robbery. In 2021, a carjacking victim in Chicago pursued a car thief, resulting in an eight-vehicle collision in which the stolen vehicle was destroyed.

In film and television 

In film and television, the term "car chase" refers to a "chase scene" involving two or more automobiles pursuing one another; the chase may or may not involve a police car. Car chases are a staple of the action movie genre, and feature-length films have been built entirely around car chases, often featuring high-powered exotic vehicles. They are popular because they are fast moving scenes that generate a great deal of excitement and action, due to the speed of the vehicles involved, and the potential collisions and the debris resulting from the wreckage, while not being hugely expensive to stage.

Staging car chase sequences often requires numerous takes and destruction of several vehicles (whether intentional or mishap), giving an incentive for filmmakers to find ways to reduce costs. Hence it is common to use older vehicles that are 1–2 generations behind the current models on the market, since these can be second-hand acquisitions at low cost due to depreciation.  There are some exceptions, if a high-profile vehicle (maybe but not necessarily a halo car) is used and/or if the vehicle manufacturer pays for product placement in a film production (serving as a technical adviser, donating vehicles to be used in filming); examples include the James Bond and Transporter franchises who use current and even concept vehicles.

Although car chases on film were staged as early as the motor vehicle itself — one of the earliest examples being "Runaway Match" directed by Alf Collins in 1903 — the consensus among historians and film critics is that the first modern car chase movie was 1968's Bullitt. The revolutionary 10-minute-long chase scene in Bullitt was far longer and far faster than what had gone before, and placed cameras so that the audience felt as though they were inside the cars. Even during the most calamitous scenes, the star, Steve McQueen, could be clearly seen at the wheel of the vehicle. Previously, car chase scenes were often staged using the rear projection effect.

The French Connection further increased the realism. While previous chases had obviously been filmed on closed roads, isolated highways, or Sunday mornings (including Bullitt), The French Connection placed the chase in the midst of busy New York traffic and pedestrians. The producer of both Bullitt and The French Connection, Philip D'Antoni, went on to direct The Seven-Ups with yet another trademark chase sequence through New York featuring Roy Scheider from The French Connection as well as Bill Hickman, one of the drivers who had previously appeared in Bullitt.

As time went on, so did the expectations of the movie car chase. Since Bullitt, car chases featured in movies have become more advanced and arguably more entertaining. Car crashes have also formed an increasingly important role, with the destruction of any vehicle often coming as a delight to the viewer. An early example of a staged but startling accident in a movie chase can be found in the 1974 movie McQ, which featured an incredible rollover, the first cannon rollover in fact, across a beach. The spectacle came at a cost, however, for stunt driver Hal Needham, who sustained multiple injuries after setting the explosives too high.

Eventually this resulted in movies which are not much more than a series of linked car chases, such as the 1974 film Gone in 60 Seconds, which culminated in a 40-minute car chase scene with multiple crashes (some of them unplanned, real accidents) and a 30-foot-high, 128-feet-long airborne jump over crashed cars that block a road.

Arguably the most typical car chase is one in which a car is being pursued by police cars. In part because car chases are so common many movie makers try to introduce a new twists to them. One of the most famous variations is from The French Connection and involves a car chasing an elevated train. Chases involving buses, trucks, snowmobiles, trains, tanks, and virtually every other type of vehicle (with or without wheels) have appeared at some point.

Car chases can also be played for laughs. Films such as The Blues Brothers, The Keystone Kops, W.C. Fields comedies, The Three Stooges, It's a Mad, Mad, Mad, Mad World, The Shaggy Dog, The Gumball Rally, No Deposit, No Return, Freaky Friday, The Gnome Mobile, The Million Dollar Duck, What's Up, Doc?, Short Time, and many others have car chases that are used for comedy.

Probably the most complex type of car chase involves going the wrong way at high speed against moderately congested freeway traffic, most notably in To Live and Die in L.A. and Ronin which, by no small coincidence, were directed by William Friedkin (The French Connection) and John Frankenheimer (French Connection II), respectively.

Several films that feature complex large-scale chases involving a lot of vehicles in the pursuit include The Blues Brothers, The Transporter, Raiders of the Lost Ark, The Road Warrior, and The Fast and the Furious series. Another method of escalating a car chase scene is to have a character move from one vehicle to another and to fight in or on top of a moving vehicle as the Wachowskis employed very effectively in The Matrix Reloaded.

A number of television shows have been built around the popularity of car chases, such as CHiPs, The Dukes of Hazzard, Knight Rider, Airwolf, and most recently, Chase.

In the action comedy film Hot Fuzz, the scene in which Sergeant Angel chases the speeding car has been declared the shortest car chase in film history. The brevity of the scene, as acknowledged in interviews, was itself the joke.

Computer-generated imagery
In more modern times, the use of computer-generated imagery is becoming increasingly popular, and, although costly, eliminates any danger level. While impressive at times, it is often argued that it eliminates the realism of the chase scene, which can then in turn damage the established thrill factor. Recent examples of this computer-generated imagery can be found in the Michael Bay films Bad Boys II and The Island. Driven was particularly panned for its CGI car chase sequences. 

Such criticism has affected recent Hollywood productions; for example, films like Ronin, The Bourne Supremacy, The Kingdom, The Dark Knight and Need For Speed all had actual live-action chases with minimal use of CGI, if at all. For instance Furious 7 stunt coordinator Spiro Razatos wanted to rely more on real stunts rather than CGI because he wanted the whole sequence to "feel real" and fulfill audience's expectations so only 10 percent of the action sequences in the film were computer-generated, and even then, much of the CGI was employed simply to erase the wires and other contraptions that were used to film real cars and drivers or to add a background.

In video games
Many video games, often within the open world and racing genres, tend to contain, if not focus on, car chases of some sort, usually involving police. Many of these chases are often heavily stylized, with police often ramming or even shooting suspect vehicles.

Notable examples of such games include:

Early examples included Bally Midway's Spy Hunter (1983), featuring a James Bond-style weaponized vehicle; and Atari Games' APB (1987), where the player controlled a police car.
Chase H.Q. (1988) and its sequels have the player assume the role of a police officer who, along with his partner, must stop fleeing criminals in high-speed pursuits.
The Need for Speed series is notable for its depiction of police pursuits, usually involving high-performance cars driven by both criminals and police.
The Grand Theft Auto series is especially famous for its depiction of car chases in both missions and its open world, with reckless pursuits by both criminals and police being possible in almost every game in the series.
L.A. Noire (2011) features police pursuits in several of its cases and missions, though unlike Grand Theft Auto, the player takes the role of the police.

See also 
Commandeering
Traffic stop
Carjacking
Motor vehicle theft
Street racing
Road rage
Skye's Law

References

External links
 Statistics and Facts
 IACP Police Chase report

 
Film and video terminology
Traffic law
Crimes
Chase